Erwin Fuchsbichler (born 27 March 1952) is an Austrian football goalkeeper who played for Austria in the 1978 FIFA World Cup. He also played for Kapfenberger SV, SK Rapid Wien, SK VÖEST Linz, and SK Vorwärts Steyr.

References

External links
FIFA profile

1952 births
Austrian footballers
Austria international footballers
Association football goalkeepers
Kapfenberger SV players
SK Rapid Wien players
1978 FIFA World Cup players
Living people
People from Kapfenberg
Footballers from Styria